This timeline of prehistory covers the time from the appearance of Homo sapiens 315,000 years ago in Africa to the invention of writing, over 5,000 years ago, with the earliest records going back to 3,200 BC. Prehistory covers the time from the Paleolithic (Old Stone Age) to the very beginnings of ancient history.

All dates are approximate and subject to revision based on new discoveries or analyses.

Middle Paleolithic

See Timeline of human evolution, Timeline of natural history for earlier evolutionary history.

 ∼320,000 to 305,000 years ago: Populations at Olorgesailie in Southern Kenya undergo technological improvements in tool making and engage in long-distance trade.
 315,000 years ago: approximate date of appearance of Homo sapiens (Jebel Irhoud, Morocco).
 270,000 years ago: age of Y-DNA haplogroup A00 ("Y-chromosomal Adam").
 250,000 years ago: first appearance of Homo neanderthalensis (Saccopastore skulls).
 230,000–150,000 years ago: age of mt-DNA haplogroup L ("Mitochondrial Eve").
 210,000 years ago: modern human presence in southeast Europe (Apidima, Greece). 
 200,000 years ago: oldest known grass bedding, including insect-repellent plants and ash layers beneath (possibly for a dirt-free, insulated base and to keep away arthropods).
 195,000 years ago: Omo remains (Ethiopia).
 194,000–177,000 years ago: modern human presence in West Asia (Misliya cave in Israel).
 170,000 years ago: humans are wearing clothing by this date.
 ∼164,000 years ago: humans diet expands to include marine resources
 160,000 years ago: Homo sapiens idaltu.
 150,000 years ago: Peopling of Africa: Khoisanid separation, age of mtDNA haplogroup L0.
 130,000 years ago: oldest evidence of ancient seafaring, from Crete (an island isolated from land for millions of years prior to human arrival). 
 125,000 years ago: the peak of the Eemian interglacial period.
 ~120,000 years ago: possibly the earliest evidence of use of symbols etched onto bone.
 ~120,000 years ago: use of marine shells for personal decoration by humans, including Neandertals.
 120,000–90,000 years ago: Abbassia Pluvial in North Africa—the Sahara desert region is wet and fertile.
 120,000–75,000 years ago: Khoisanid back-migration from Southern Africa to East Africa.
 100,000 years ago: Earliest structures in the world (sandstone blocks set in a semi-circle with an oval foundation) built in Egypt close to Wadi Halfa near the modern border with Sudan.
 82,000 years ago: small perforated seashell beads from Taforalt in Morocco are the earliest evidence of personal adornment found anywhere in the world.
 80,000–70,000 years ago: Recent African origin: separation of sub-Saharan Africans and non-Africans.
 75,000 years ago: Toba Volcano supereruption that may have contributed to human populations being lowered to about 15,000 people.
 70,000 years ago: earliest example of abstract art or symbolic art from Blombos Cave, South Africa—stones engraved with grid or cross-hatch patterns.

Upper Paleolithic

"Epipaleolithic" or "Mesolithic" are terms for a transitional period between the Last Glacial Maximum and the Neolithic Revolution in Old World (Eurasian) cultures.
 80,000–40,000: Evidence of Australian Aboriginal Culture.
 67,000–40,000 years ago: Neanderthal admixture to Eurasians.
 50,000 years ago: earliest sewing needle found. Made and used by Denisovans.
 50,000–30,000 years ago: Mousterian Pluvial in North Africa. The Sahara desert region is wet and fertile. Late Stone Age begins in Africa.
 45,000–43,000 years ago: Early European modern humans.
 45,000–40,000 years ago: Châtelperronian cultures in France.
 42,000 years ago: Laschamps event, a geomagnetic excursion with major implications for humans at the time.
 42,000 years ago: Paleolithic flutes in Germany.
 42,000 years ago: earliest evidence of advanced deep sea fishing technology at the Jerimalai cave site in East Timor—demonstrates high-level maritime skills and by implication the technology needed to make ocean crossings to reach Australia and other islands, as they were catching and consuming large numbers of big deep sea fish such as tuna.
 41,000 years ago: Denisova hominin lives in the Altai Mountains.
 40,000 years ago: extinction of Homo neanderthalensis.

 40,000 years ago: Aurignacian culture begins in Europe.
 40,000 years ago: oldest known figurative art the zoomorphic Löwenmensch figurine.

 40,000–30,000 years ago: First human settlements formed by Aboriginal Australians in several areas that are today the cities of Sydney, Perth and Melbourne.
 40,000–20,000 years ago: oldest known ritual cremation, the Mungo Lady, in Lake Mungo, Australia.
 35,000 years ago: oldest known figurative art of a human figure as opposed to a zoomorphic figure (Venus of Hohle Fels).
 33,000 years ago: earliest evidence of humanoids in Ireland.
 31,000–16,000 years ago: Last Glacial Maximum (peak at 26,500 years ago).
 30,000 years ago: rock paintings tradition begins in Bhimbetka rock shelters in India, which presently as a collection is the densest known concentration of rock art. In an area about 10 km2, there are about 800 rock shelters of which 500 contain paintings.
 29,000 years ago: The earliest ovens found.
 28,500 years ago: New Guinea is populated by colonists from Asia or Australia.
 28,000 years ago: oldest known twisted rope.
 28,000–24,000 years ago: oldest known pottery—used to make figurines rather than cooking or storage vessels (Venus of Dolní Věstonice).
 28,000–20,000 years ago: Gravettian period in Europe. Harpoons and saws invented.
 26,000 years ago: people around the world use fibers to make baby carriers, clothes, bags, baskets, and nets.
 25,000 years ago: a hamlet consisting of huts built of rocks and of mammoth bones is founded in what is now Dolní Věstonice in Moravia in the Czech Republic. Dolní Věstonice (archaeological site) is the oldest human permanent settlement that has yet been found by archaeologists.
 24,000 years ago: The cave bear is thought to have become extinct.
 24,000 years ago: Evidence suggests humans living in Alaska and Yukon North America.
 23,000–21,000 years ago: The earliest known human footprints in North America are left at what is now White Sands National Park, New Mexico. It is also the earliest known evidence of the Oasisamerica civilizations, which eventually became the cultures in modern Northern Mexico and Southwestern United States.
 21,000 years ago: artifacts suggest early human activity occurred in Canberra, the capital city of Australia.
 20,000 years ago: Kebaran culture in the Levant: beginning of the Epipalaeolithic in the Levant.
 20,000 years ago: theorized earliest date of development of traditional Inuit skin clothing.
 20,000–10,000 years ago: Khoisanid expansion to Central Africa.
 20,000–19,000 years ago: earliest pottery use, in Xianren Cave, China.
 18,000–12,000 years ago: Though estimations vary widely, it is believed by scholars that Afro-Asiatic was spoken as a single language around this time period.
 16,000–14,000 years ago: Minatogawa Man (Proto-Mongoloid phenotype) in Okinawa, Japan.
 16,000–11,000 years ago: Caucasus hunter-gatherer expansion to Europe.
 16,000 years ago: Wisent (European bison) sculpted in clay deep inside the cave now known as Le Tuc d'Audoubert in the French Pyrenees near what is now the border of Spain.
 15,000–14,700 years ago (13,000 BC to 12,700 BC): Earliest supposed date for the domestication of the pig.
 14,200 years ago: The oldest agreed domestic dog remains belongs to the Bonn-Oberkassel dog that was buried with two humans.
 14,000–12,000 years ago: Oldest evidence for prehistoric warfare (Jebel Sahaba, Natufian culture).
 13,000–10,000 years ago: Last Glacial Maximum, end of the Last Glacial Period, climate warms, glaciers recede.
 13,000 years ago: A major water outbreak occurs on Lake Agassiz, which at the time could have been the size of the current Black Sea and the largest lake on Earth. Much of the lake is drained in the Arctic Ocean through the Mackenzie River.
 13,000–11,000 years ago: Earliest dates suggested for the domestication of the sheep.
 12,900–11,700 years ago: The Younger Dryas, a period of sudden cooling and return to glacial conditions.
 c. 12,000 years ago: Volcanic eruptions in the Virunga Mountains blocked Lake Kivu outflow into Lake Edward and the Nile system, diverting the water to Lake Tanganyika. Nile's total length is shortened and Lake Tanganyika's surface is increased.   
 12,000 years ago: Earliest dates suggested for the domestication of the goat.

Holocene

The terms "Neolithic" and "Bronze Age" are culture-specific and are mostly limited to cultures of the Old World. Many populations of the New World remain in the Mesolithic cultural stage until European contact in the modern period.

 11,600 years ago (9,600 BC): An abrupt period of global warming accelerates the glacial retreat; taken as the beginning of the Holocene geological epoch.
 11,600 years ago: Jericho has evidence of settlement dating back to 9,600 BC. Jericho was a popular camping ground for Natufian hunter-gatherer groups, who left a scattering of crescent microlith tools behind them.
 11,200–11,000 years ago: Meltwater pulse 1B, a sudden rise of sea level by  within about 160 years.
 11,000 years ago (9,000 BC): Earliest date recorded for construction of temenoi ceremonial structures at Göbekli Tepe in southern Turkey, as possibly the oldest surviving proto-religious site on Earth.
 11,000 years ago (9,000 BC): Giant short-faced bears and giant ground sloths go extinct. Equidae goes extinct in North America.
 11,000-8,000 years ago (9,000 BC to 7,000 BC): the Ancestral Puebloans, in modern day New Mexico and the Southwestern United States, begin their Archaic–Early Basketmaker Era. Leading to art styles in pottery and basketmaking that are still used in the region. As well as early structures in the Pueblo architecture style, including some of those seen at Chaco Culture National Historical Park.
 10,500 years ago (8,500 BC): Earliest supposed date for the domestication of cattle.
 10,000 years ago (8,000 BC): The Quaternary extinction event, which has been ongoing since the mid-Pleistocene, concludes. Many of the ice age megafauna go extinct, including the megatherium, woolly rhinoceros, Irish elk, cave bear, cave lion, and the last of the sabre-toothed cats. The mammoth goes extinct in Eurasia and North America, but is preserved in small island populations until ~1650 BC.
 10,800–9,000 years ago: Byblos appears to have been settled during the PPNB period, approximately 8800 to 7000 BC. Neolithic remains of some buildings can be observed at the site.
 10,000–8,000 years ago (8000 BC to 6000 BC): The post-glacial sea level rise decelerates, slowing the submersion of landmasses that had taken place over the previous 10,000 years.
 10,000–9,000 years ago (8000 BC to 7000 BC): In northern Mesopotamia, now northern Iraq, cultivation of barley and wheat begins. At first they are used for beer, gruel, and soup, eventually for bread. In early agriculture at this time, the planting stick is used, but it is replaced by a primitive plow in subsequent centuries.
 10,000–5,000 years ago (8,000–3,000 BC) Identical ancestors point: sometime in this period lived the latest subgroup of human population consisting of those that were all common ancestors of all present day humans, the rest having no present day descendants.
 9,500–5,500 years ago: Neolithic Subpluvial in North Africa. The Sahara desert region supports a savanna-like environment. Lake Chad is larger than the current Caspian Sea. An African culture develops across the current Sahel region.
 9,500 years ago (7500 BC): Çatalhöyük urban settlement founded in Anatolia. Earliest supposed date for the domestication of the cat.
 9,000 years ago (7000 BC): Jiahu culture begins in China.
 9,000 years ago: First large-scale fish fermentation in southern Sweden.
 9,000 years ago: Human settlement of Mehrgarh, one of the earliest sites with evidence of farming and herding in South Asia. In April 2006, Nature note that the oldest (and first early Neolithic) evidence for the drilling of human teeth in vivo (i.e. in a living person) was found in Mehrgarh.
 8,200–8,000 years ago: 8.2-kiloyear event: a sudden decrease of global temperatures, probably caused by the final collapse of the Laurentide Ice Sheet, which leads to drier conditions in East Africa and Mesopotamia.
 8,000–5,000 years ago: (6000 BC–3000 BC) development of proto-writing in China, Southeast Europe (Vinca symbols) and West Asia (proto-literate cuneiform).
However, evidence of settlement in the wider Barada basin dating back to 9000 BC exists.
 7,500 years ago (5500 BC): Copper smelting in evidence in Pločnik and other locations.
 7,700–6,500 years ago (5700–4500 BC): Vinča culture.
 7,200–6,000 years ago: 5200–4000 BC:Għar Dalam phase on Malta. First farming settlements on the island.
 6300 or 6350 years ago: Akahoya eruption creates the Kikai Caldera and ends the earliest homogeneous Jomon culture in Japan. When the Jomon culture recovers, it shows regional differences.
 6,100–5,800 years ago: 4100–3800 BC: Żebbuġ phase, Malta.
 6,070–6,000 years ago (4050–4000 BC): Trypillian build in Nebelivka (Ukraine) settlement which reached 15,000–18,000 inhabitants.
 6,500 years ago: The oldest known gold hoard deposited at Varna Necropolis, Bulgaria.
 6,000 years ago (4000 BC): Civilizations develop in the Mesopotamia/Fertile Crescent region (around the location of modern-day Iraq). Earliest supposed dates for the domestication of the horse and for the domestication of the chicken, invention of the potter's wheel.

4th millennium BC

 5,840–5,800 years ago (3840–3800 BC): The Post Track and Sweet Track causeways are constructed in the Somerset Levels.
 5,800 years ago (3800 BC): Trypillian build in Talianki (Ukraine) settlement which reached 15,600–21,000 inhabitants.
 5,800–5,600 years ago: (3800–3600 BC): Mġarr phase A short transitional period in Malta's prehistory. It is characterized by pottery consisting of mainly curved lines.
 5,700 years ago (3700 BC): mass graves at Tell Brak in Syria.
 5,700 years ago (3700 BC): Trypillian build in Maidanets (Ukraine) settlement which reached 12,000–46,000 inhabitants, and built three-story building.
 5,700 years ago (3700 BC): Minoan culture begins on Crete.
 5,600–5,200 years ago (3600–3200 BC): Ġgantija phase on Malta. Characterized by a change in the way the prehistoric inhabitants of Malta lived.
 5,500 years ago (3500 BC): Uruk period in Sumer. First evidence of mummification in Egypt.
 5,500 years ago (3500 BC): oldest known depiction of a wheeled vehicle (Bronocice pot, Funnelbeaker culture).
 5,500 years ago (3500 BC): Earliest conjectured date for the still-undeciphered Indus script.
 5,500 years ago (3500 BC): End of the African humid period possibly linked to the Piora Oscillation: a rapid and intense aridification event, which probably started the current Sahara Desert dry phase and a population increase in the Nile Valley due to migrations from nearby regions. It is also believed this event contributed to the end of the Ubaid period in Mesopotamia.
 5,400 years ago (3400 BC): Waun Mawn is built in West Wales.
 5,300 years ago (3300 BC): Bronze Age begins in the Near East Newgrange is built in Ireland. Ness of Brodgar is built in Orkney Hakra Phase of the Indus Valley civilisation begins in the Indian subcontinent.
 5,300–5,000 years ago (3300–3000 BC): Saflieni phase in Maltese prehistory.
 5,200 years ago (3200 BC): The Bronze Age begins on Crete, signaling the beginning of the Early Minoan Period.

3rd millennium BC

 5,000 years ago (3000 BC): Settlement of Skara Brae built in Orkney.
 4,600 years ago (2600 BC): Writing is developed in Sumer and Egypt, triggering the beginning of recorded history.

Research
Researchers deduced in a scientific review that "no specific point in time can currently be identified at which modern human ancestry was confined to a limited birthplace" and that current knowledge about long, continuous and complex – e.g. often non-singular, parallel, nonsimultaneous and/or gradual – emergences of characteristics is consistent with a range of evolutionary histories. A timeline dating first occurrences and earliest evidence may therefore be an often inadequate approach for describing humanity's (pre-)history.

Post-historical prehistories

 3,800 years ago (1800 BC): Currently undeciphered Minoan script (Linear A) and Cypro-Minoan script developed on Crete and Cyprus.  
 3,450 years ago (1450 BC): Mycenaean Greece, first deciphered writing in Europe
 3,200 years ago (1200 BC): Oracle bone script, first written records in Old Chinese
 3,050–2,800 years ago (1050–800 BC): Alphabetic writing; the Phoenician alphabet spreads around the Mediterranean
 2,300 years ago (300 BC): Maya script, the only known full writing system developed in the Americas, emerges.    
 2,260 years ago (260 BC): Earliest deciphered written records in South Asia (Middle Indo-Aryan)
 1800s AD: Undeciphered Rongorongo script on Easter Island may mark the latest independent development of writing.

See also

 List of languages by first written accounts
 Timeline of ancient history
 Timeline of the early universe
 Timeline of historic inventions
 Timeline of human evolution
 Timeline of the evolutionary history of life

Prehistory by world region

 Near East
 Prehistoric Mesopotamia (before 3000 BC)
 Prehistoric Egypt (before 3000 BC)
 Prehistory of Anatolia (before 2000 BC)
 Prehistory of Iran (before 1000 BC)
 Prehistoric Caucasus (before 1000 BC)
 Prehistoric China (before 1000 BC)
 Prehistoric Europe (before 800 BC)
 Prehistory of Central Asia (before 600 BC)
 Prehistoric Siberia (before AD 500)
 Pre-Columbian Americas (before 1492)
 Prehistory of Australia (before 1788)

References

Bibliography

External links
 Human Timeline (Interactive) – Smithsonian, National Museum of Natural History (August 2016).

Prehistory
Prehistory
human prehistory